"That Way" (stylized in all lowercase letters) is a song by Canadian singer Tate McRae, from her debut EP All the Things I Never Said (2020). The song was written by McRae, Skyler Stonestreet, and Nick Monson and produced by Nick Monson. "That Way" is a minimalist piano ballad.

Background and release
McRae originally previewed first half of the song on YouTube in December 2019. The song was officially released alongside her EP on January 24, 2020. The song was written in late 2018 or early 2019, when McRae was in Grade 10. The song became a sleeper hit, performing moderately on its release but after going viral on TikTok in 2021, due to the lyric "friends don't look at friends that way", the song charted in the UK and Ireland, and was certified Platinum in the US, Gold in Australia, Canada, and Denmark and Silver in the UK. The song has attracted over 470,000 videos on TikTok combined, over 202 million views on TikTok on the official sound, and over 170 million streams on Spotify. A remix with Jeremy Zucker was released on September 3, 2021.

Composition and lyrics 
The song narrates a friendship that becomes more than platonic, but both parties can't act on their mutual attraction for each other. McRae has noted that the song is based on a real experience and is about having a crush on someone you know you would never be with. The song was described by Ashley Osborn of Ones to Watch as the sadder, more mature version of Taylor Swift's "You Belong with Me". Osborn remarked that the song expresses sentiments of deeper feelings for a friend matched by unclear signs, resulting in perplexing dejection. The song has also been described as using "heartbreakingly specific lyrics to describe a friendship that always comes tantalizingly close to taking the next step but never does, the friendship itself on life support as it hangs around in an awkward limbo."

Critical reception 
Writing for Ones to Watch, Ashley Osborn remarks that the song is the perfect testament to McRae's incredible ability to express distinct moments of emotional strife through her unique thread of vocal performance. Music review site Ben's Beat describes that the song as one of the most emotional tracks on the EP, noting that McRae's sorrowful vocals are mainly supported by muted percussion hits and slowly moving piano chords, but this suffices, due to the conviction and heartfelt emotion in the song.

Music video
The music video featured McRae dancing alone in a room lit with blue light, to her own choreography, in the contemporary dance style.  McRae remarked of the video in a press release, "I have multiple sides to me; a lot of layers that people have not yet seen. My dancing is a huge part of my life, so I'm so glad I finally get to create movement to a song that's really personal to me."

Live performances 
McRae performed the song on Late Night with Seth Meyers on October 14, 2021.

Credits
Credits adapted from Tidal 
 Tate McRae – vocals, composer, lyricist
 Skyler Stonestreet– composer, lyricist
 Nick Monson – producer, composer, lyricist, engineer
 Dave Kutch – mastering engineer
 Dave Cook – mixing engineer

Charts

Certifications

References

2021 singles
2021 songs
Tate McRae songs
RCA Records singles
Songs written by Tate McRae
Songs written by Skyler Stonestreet
Songs written by Nick Monson